The 1983 Fila Europa Cup was a women's tennis tournament played on outdoor clay courts in Hamburg, West Germany that was part of Category 2 of the 1983 Virginia Slims World Championship Series. It was the second edition of the tournament and was held from 4 July through 10 July 1983. First-seeded  Andrea Temesvári won the singles title.

Finals

Singles
 Andrea Temesvári defeated  Eva Pfaff 6–4, 6–2
It was Temesvari's 2nd title of the year and of her career.

Doubles
 Bettina Bunge /  Claudia Kohde-Kilsch defeated  Ivanna Madruga-Osses /  Catherine Tanvier 7–5 6–4
It was Bunge's 2nd title of the year and the 5th of her career. It was Kohde-Kilsch's 2nd title of the year and the 6th of her career.

External links
 ITF tournament edition details

Fila Europa Cup Hittfeld
WTA Hamburg
1983 in German women's sport
1983 in German tennis